Butter is the surname of the following people
Anton Julius Butter (1920–1989), Dutch economist
John Butter (1791–1877), English ophthalmic surgeon
Michel Butter (born 1985), Dutch runner
Nathaniel Butter (died 1664), London publisher
Wes Butters (born 1979), British radio broadcaster

See also
Buter
Butters (surname)

English-language surnames